Letter of Introduction is a 1938 American comedy-drama film directed by John M. Stahl.

In 1966, the film entered the public domain in the United States because the claimants did not renew its copyright registration in the 28th year after publication.

Plot
An aging actor, John Mannering, is surprised when his estranged daughter, Kay Martin, shows up. She is an actress trying to succeed on Broadway. He is persuaded to perform on Broadway for the first time in twelve years in a play with her. He is anxious about his performance, so turns to alcohol to overcome his self-doubt.  He tries to re-establish his relationship with his daughter while trying to hide from the press that she is his daughter.

Cast 
Adolphe Menjou as John Mannering
Andrea Leeds as Katherine "Kay" Martin
George Murphy as Barry Paige
Edgar Bergen as himself
Rita Johnson as Honey
Ann Sheridan as Lydia Hoyt
Ernest Cossart as Andrews, the Butler
Frank Jenks as Joe, theatre prompter
Eve Arden as Cora Phelps
Charlie McCarthy as Himself - dummy
Mortimer Snerd as Himself - dummy
Ray Walker as Reporter

References

External links 

1938 films
1938 comedy-drama films
American comedy-drama films
1930s English-language films
Films directed by John M. Stahl
American black-and-white films
Films about actors
Universal Pictures films
1930s American films